Ptychobela vexillum is a species of sea snail, a marine gastropod mollusk in the family Pseudomelatomidae, the turrids and allies.

R.N. Kilburn proposed in 1989  Brachytoma vexillum Habe & Kosuge, 1966 as a synonym of Ptychobela suturalis (Gray, 1838)

The epithet vexillium was probably a misspelling in the original text, but was not indicated as such. Therefore, it takes priority over vexillum, published five-month later and repeated later by some authors.

Description
The length of the shell attains 46.5 mm, its diameter 14.5 mm.

Distribution
This marine species occurs in the South China Sea, off the Philippines and Japan; also off Australia (Northern Territory, Queensland, Western Australia).

References

 Habe, T. & S. Kosuge, 1966a, Shells of the world in colour, Vol. I. The tropical Pacific. vii, (2 pp. map], 193 pp., pis. 1–68, supplemental pis. 1–2; Hoikusha, Osaka

External links
  Baoquan Li 李宝泉 & R.N. Kilburn, Report on Crassispirinae Morrison, 1966 (Mollusca: Neogastropoda: Turridae) from the China Seas; Journal of Natural History 44(11):699–740 · March 2010; DOI: 10.1080/00222930903470086
 Gastropods.com: Brachytoma vexillum
 

vexillium
Gastropods described in 1966